This is a list of butterflies of Kiribati. This list includes species found on the US islands Baker Island, Howland Island, Jarvis Island and Kingman Reef.

Nymphalidae

Danainae
Danaus plexippus plexippus  (Linnaeus, 1758)

Nymphalinae
Hypolimnas bolina rarik von Eschscholtz, 1821
Junonia villida villida  (Fabricius, 1787)

References
W.John Tennent: A checklist of the butterflies of Melanesia, Micronesia, Polynesia and some adjacent areas. Zootaxa 1178: 1-209 (21 Apr. 2006)

Butter
Kiribati
Kiribati
Kiribati
Butterflies